Choi Seung-youn (born 25 July 1964) is a South Korean speed skater. She competed in three events at the 1984 Winter Olympics.

References

1964 births
Living people
South Korean female speed skaters
Olympic speed skaters of South Korea
Speed skaters at the 1984 Winter Olympics
Place of birth missing (living people)
Speed skaters at the 1986 Asian Winter Games
20th-century South Korean women